DKU may refer to:

Communist Youth of Denmark, also known as Danmarks Kommunistiske Ungdom, a defunct Danish Communist youth organisation
Dankook University, a private research university in Yongin and Cheonan, South Korea
Duke Kunshan University, a Chinese-American partnership of Duke University and Wuhan University in Kunshan, Jiangsu, China